Fuzhou is a railway station on the Taiwan Railways Administration West Coast line located in Banqiao District, New Taipei, Taiwan.

History
The station was first opened in 1932 as a temporary station. It was closed in 1942, reopened in 1953 but ceased to operate soon afterwards. The new station began to operate on 2 September 2011, as a result of TRA's policy of transforming its railroad lines into MRT-type railroad. The only train that stops at this station is the local train. The station is located at the outskirts of Banqiao, and is mostly used by commuters.

Around the station
Schools and Universities
National Taiwan University of Arts (450m to the northeast)
National Overseas Chinese Senior High School (300m to the north)
Parks
浮洲親民公園 (750m to the south)
Fuzhou Art Riverside Park (1.4km to the southwest)

See also
 List of railway stations in Taiwan

References

2011 establishments in Taiwan
Railway stations served by Taiwan Railways Administration
Railway stations in New Taipei
Railway stations opened in 2011